Turntable stretch wrappers are a type of automatic and semi-automatic stretch wrapping system.  A load is placed on a turntable, which rotates relative to the film roll, which is housed in a carriage attached to a vertical "mast" on which it may move up and down.

Information
In the simplest turntable systems, stretch is achieved by rotating the load at a speed in which the take-up demand on the load surface is faster than the rate at which the film is allowed to be fed, being limited by a brake system.

More sophisticated systems also pre-stretch the film before wrapping by means of fixed/variable gear ratios or other, even more sophisticated means, such as hydraulic ratios which can better take advantage of film "sweet spots", improving performance and film savings.

References

External links
Gloss Metallic Car Vinyl Wrap
Filling, Packing & Packaging Machine
 "Encyclopedia of Packaging Technology" 

Packaging machinery